Kamenny Brod is a rural locality (a selo) and the administrative center of Kamennobrodskoye Rural Settlement, Olkhovsky District, Volgograd Oblast, Russia. The population was 414 as of 2010. There are 4 streets.

Geography 
Kamenny Brod is located 9 km southwest of Olkhovka (the district's administrative centre) by road. Olkhovka is the nearest rural locality.

References 

Rural localities in Olkhovsky District
Tsaritsynsky Uyezd